Boris Dmitrievich Gorbunov (10 September 1938 – 15 November 2022) was a Soviet-Russian farmer and politician. A member of the Communist Party, he served on the Supreme Soviet of the Soviet Union from 1979 to 1989.

Gorbunov died on 15 November 2022 at the age of 84.

References

1938 births
2022 deaths
Russian farmers
Communist Party of the Soviet Union members
Members of the Supreme Soviet of the Soviet Union
People from Gornomariysky District